Ana Patricia Rojo Stein (born February 13, 1974) is a Mexican actress and singer.

She is famous for her participation in many telenovelas of Televisa, like María la del barrio as Penelope Linares (1995), Esmeralda as Georgina Pérez-Montalvo (1997), Destilando amor as Sofía Montalvo (2007), Cuidado con el ángel as Estefanía Rojas/Velarde (2008), as Raiza Canseco in Televisa's remake of Marimar, Corazón indomable (2013). Is the protagonist in the telenovela Mujer de Madera as Marisa Santibáñez, where replacement Edith Gonzalez (2004). Is the Main Antagonist in Un camino hacia el destino (2016). In (2019) he is part of the La Guzmán series, in which he has an important character, representing María de los Ángeles Torrieri. It is the first time that she has done a job as an actress in the Imagen Televisión chain.

Filmography

Movies

Telenovelas

Series

References

External links
 
Biografía de Ana Patricia Rojo en esmas.com

1974 births
Living people
Mexican child actresses
Mexican telenovela actresses
Mexican television actresses
Mexican film actresses
Mexican stage actresses
Actresses from Tabasco
20th-century Mexican actresses
21st-century Mexican actresses
Mexican people of Uruguayan descent
Mexican people of Peruvian descent
Mexican people of Canarian descent
People from Villahermosa
21st-century Mexican singers